Bumpin'   is an album by the American jazz guitarist Wes Montgomery, released in 1965. It reached number 116 on the Billboard 200 chart. It was Montgomery's first album to reach the charts.

Reception 
{{Album ratings
| rev1 = AllMusic
| rev1Score = <ref name="AM">
In his AllMusic review, Shawn M. Haney praised the album: "Not only is his brilliant command of the six-string present here, so is the vivid color tones of notes and blue notes played between. Backed up by a hauntingly beautiful and mesmerizing orchestra conducted and arranged by Don Sebesky, the music almost lifts the listener off his feet into a dreamy, water-like landscape. The atmosphere is serene and enchanting, such as a romantic evening for two under starlight, and certainly a romantic eve merits the accompaniment of this record... The recording engineer did a wonderful job with this album. The sound quality is clear and lush, and, overall, this collection of mid-'60s Latin jazz is a delight to listen to, once and again."

Track listing
"Bumpin'" (Wes Montgomery) – 6:40
"Tear It Down" (Montgomery) – 3:10
"A Quiet Thing" (Fred Ebb, John Kander) – 3:27
"Con Alma" (Dizzy Gillespie) – 3:25
"The Shadow of Your Smile" (Johnny Mandel, Paul Francis Webster) – 2:15
"Mi Cosa" (Montgomery) – 3:15
"Here's That Rainy Day" (Johnny Burke, Jimmy Van Heusen) – 4:50
"Musty" (Don Sebesky) – 4:12

Bonus tracks on the CD release
"Just Walkin'" – 3:00
"My One and Only Love" (Robert Mellin, Guy Wood) – 4:09
"Just Walkin'" [alternate take] – 3:37

Personnel

Wes Montgomery – guitar
Bob Cranshaw – bass
Grady Tate – drums
Harry Lookofsky – violin
David Schwartz – viola
Charles McCracken – cello
Margaret Ross – harp
Roger Kellaway – piano
Don Sebesky – arranger, conductor
Candido Camero – bongos, congas
Harold Coletta – viola
Arnold Eidus – violin
Lewis Eley – violin
Paul Gershman – violin
Louis Haber – violin
Julius Held – violin
Joseph Malignaggi – violin
Helcio Milito – drums
Gene Orloff – violin
George Ricci – violin, cello
Sol Shapiro – violin

Chart positions

References

Wes Montgomery albums
1965 albums
Albums produced by Creed Taylor
Verve Records albums
Albums recorded at Van Gelder Studio
PolyGram albums
Albums arranged by Don Sebesky
Albums conducted by Don Sebesky